Ivana Andrés Sanz (born 13 July 1994) is a Spanish professional footballer who plays as a centre back for Liga F club Real Madrid, which she captains, and the Spain women's national team.

Career

Club
After starting at her local team, Aielo CF, she joined the DSV Colegio Alemán school in the 2007–08 campaign and reached the Valencia CF first team in the 2009–10 season.

After several years in the team, being the club captain for the last seasons, she made a surprise transfer to city rivals Levante UD.

International
She is a Spanish international since 2015. As an under-17 international she won the 2010 and 2011 U-17 European Championships and a bronze in the 2010 U-17 World Cup.

She was part of Spain's squad at the 2015 Women's World Cup in Canada.

Honours

International
 Spain
 UEFA Women's Under-17 Championship (2): 2010, 2011
 Algarve Cup: Winner 2017

Private life 
Andrés is since June 2022 married with her girlfriend Anabel.

References

External links
 
 
 Profile at Valencia CF
 
Profile at Txapeldunak.com 

1994 births
Living people
Spanish women's footballers
Primera División (women) players
2015 FIFA Women's World Cup players
Valencia CF Femenino players
Spain women's international footballers
Footballers from the Valencian Community
Women's association football defenders
2019 FIFA Women's World Cup players
Levante UD Femenino players
Real Madrid Femenino players
UEFA Women's Euro 2022 players
Spanish LGBT sportspeople
LGBT association football players
Lesbian sportswomen
21st-century Spanish LGBT people
Spain women's youth international footballers